Ashok Kumar Garg (born 7 July 1969) is an Indian wrestler. He competed in the men's freestyle 57 kg at the 1992 Summer Olympics. In 1993, he won the Arjuna Award.

References

1969 births
Living people
Indian male sport wrestlers
Olympic wrestlers of India
Wrestlers at the 1992 Summer Olympics
People from Rohtak
Recipients of the Arjuna Award
Wrestlers at the 1990 Asian Games
Wrestlers at the 1994 Asian Games
Wrestlers at the 1994 Commonwealth Games
Commonwealth Games medallists in wrestling
Commonwealth Games silver medallists for India
Asian Games competitors for India
Medallists at the 1994 Commonwealth Games